
Gmina Kołaki Kościelne is a rural gmina (administrative district) in Zambrów County, Podlaskie Voivodeship, in north-eastern Poland.

Villages
Gmina Kołaki Kościelne contains the villages and settlements of Cholewy-Kołomyja, Ćwikły-Krajewo, Ćwikły-Rupie, Czachy-Kołaki, Czarnowo-Dąb, Czarnowo-Undy, Czosaki-Dąb, Głodowo-Dąb, Gosie Duże, Gosie Małe, Gunie-Ostrów, Kołaki Kościelne, Kossaki-Borowe, Krusze-Łubnice, Łętowo-Dąb, Łubnice-Krusze, Podłatki Duże, Podłatki Małe, Rębiszewo-Zegadły, Sanie-Dąb, Szczodruchy, Wiśniówek-Wertyce, Wróble-Arciszewo and Zanie-Leśnica.

Neighbouring gminas
Gmina Kołaki Kościelne is bordered by the gminas of Kulesze Kościelne, Rutki, Wysokie Mazowieckie and Zambrów.

References

Polish official population figures 2006

Kolaki Koscielne
Zambrów County